Essarts-en-Bocage is a commune in the Vendée department in the Pays de la Loire region in western France. The municipality was established on 1 January 2016 by merger of the former communes of Boulogne, Les Essarts, L'Oie and Sainte-Florence.

Population

See also
Communes of the Vendée department

References

Communes of Vendée
States and territories established in 2016